In computer science, the min-conflicts algorithm is a search algorithm or heuristic method to solve constraint satisfaction problems.

Given an initial assignment of values to all the variables of a constraint satisfaction problem, the algorithm randomly selects a variable from the set of variables with conflicts violating one or more its constraints. Then it assigns to this variable the value that minimizes the number of conflicts. If there is more than one value with a minimum number of conflicts, it chooses one randomly. This process of random variable selection and min-conflict value assignment is iterated until a solution is found or a pre-selected maximum number of iterations is reached.

Because a constraint satisfaction problem can be interpreted as a local search problem when all the variables have an assigned value (called a complete state), the min conflicts algorithm can be seen as a repair heuristic that chooses the state with the minimum number of conflicts.

Algorithm

 algorithm MIN-CONFLICTS is
     input: console.csp, A constraint satisfaction problem.
            max_steps, The number of steps allowed before giving up.
            current_state, An initial assignment of values for the variables in the csp.
     output: A solution set of values for the variable or failure.
 
     for i ← 1 to max_steps do
         if current_state is a solution of csp then
             return current_state
         set var ← a randomly chosen variable from the set of conflicted variables CONFLICTED[csp]
         set value ← the value v for var that minimizes CONFLICTS(var,v,current_state,csp)
         set var ← value in current_state
 
     return failure

Although not specified in the algorithm, a good initial assignment can be critical for quickly approaching a solution.  Use a greedy algorithm with some level of randomness and allow variable assignment to break constraints when no other assignment will suffice.  The randomness helps min-conflicts avoid local minima created by the greedy algorithm's initial assignment.  In fact, Constraint Satisfaction Problems that respond best to a min-conflicts solution do well where a greedy algorithm almost solves the problem.  Map coloring problems do poorly with Greedy Algorithm as well as Min-Conflicts.  Sub areas of the map tend to hold their colors stable and min conflicts cannot hill climb to break out of the local minimum. The  function counts the number of constraints violated by a particular object, given that the state of the rest of the assignment is known.

History
Although Artificial Intelligence and Discrete Optimization had known and reasoned about Constraint Satisfaction Problems for many years, it was not until the early 1990s that this process for solving large CSPs had been codified in algorithmic form. Early on, Mark Johnston of the Space Telescope Science Institute looked for a method to schedule astronomical observations on the Hubble Space Telescope. In collaboration with Hans-Martin Adorf of the Space Telescope European Coordinating Facility, he created a neural network capable of solving a toy n-queens problem (for 1024 queens).  Steven Minton and Andy Philips analyzed the neural network algorithm and separated it into two phases: (1) an initial assignment using a greedy algorithm and (2) a conflict minimization phases (later to be called "min-conflicts").  A paper was written and presented at AAAI-90; Philip Laird provided the mathematical analysis of the algorithm.

Subsequently, Mark Johnston and the STScI staff used min-conflicts to schedule astronomers' observation time on the Hubble Space Telescope.

Example

Min-Conflicts solves the N-Queens Problem by randomly selecting a column from the chess board for queen reassignment. The algorithm searches each potential move for the number of conflicts (number of attacking queens), shown in each square. The algorithm moves the queen to the square with the minimum number of conflicts, breaking ties randomly. Note that the number of conflicts is generated by each new direction that a queen can attack from. If two queens would attack from the same direction (row, or diagonal) then the conflict is only counted once. Also note that if a queen is in a position in which a move would put it in greater conflict than its current position, it does not make a move. It follows that if a queen is in a state of minimum conflict, it does not have to move.

This algorithm's run time for solving N-Queens is independent of problem size. This algorithm will even solve the million-queens problem on average of 50 steps. This discovery and observations led to a great amount of research in 1990 and began research on local search problems and the distinctions between easy and hard problems. N-Queens is easy for local search because solutions are densely distributed throughout the state space. It is also effective for hard problems. For example, it has been used to schedule observations for the Hubble Space Telescope, reducing the time taken to schedule a week of observations from three weeks to around 10 minutes.

See also
 Warnsdorff's algorithm
 Eight queens Puzzle
 Guided Local Search

References

 Stuart J. Russell and Peter Norvig, Artificial Intelligence: A Modern Approach

External links
  The min-conflicts heuristic microform : experiment and theoretical results / Steven Minton ... [et al.]. NASA, Ames Research Center, Artificial Intelligence Research Branch. Distributed to depository libraries in microfiche.

Constraint programming